Salaberry-de-Valleyfield is a city in southwestern Quebec, Canada, in the Regional County Municipality of Beauharnois-Salaberry.

The population as of 2019 was 42,410. Situated on Grande-Île, an island in the Saint Lawrence River, it is bordered at its western end by Lake Saint Francis, with the Saint Lawrence to the north and the Beauharnois Canal to its south. The Port of Valleyfield is on the canal.

The historic downtown is a major touristic centre for the area.

Due to the presence of Lake St. Francis (St. Lawrence River), St. Francis Bay in downtown, and of numerous rivers and canals all over the town, the city is nicknamed "The Venice of Quebec".

History
The actual city was founded in 1874, the first mayor was Moise Plante. The first settlers arrived in 1798. At that moment, the settlement was named Pointe-du-Lac (Lake Point). The colony was then renamed Saranac, then Sainte-Cécile. Salaberry-de-Valleyfield was officially named in 1874 after Colonel Charles de Salaberry who served with the British army during the War of 1812. "Valleyfield" came from the Valleyfield Mills, a paper mill south of Edinburgh in Scotland.

The city is the seat of the Roman Catholic Diocese of Valleyfield, founded in 1892.

Salaberry-de-Valleyfield is also the seat of the judicial district of Beauharnois since 1901.

Merger
In 2002, the city of 26,170 amalgamated with the following communities (2001 Canada census figures):
 Saint-Timothée (8,299)
 Grande-Île (4,559)

Politics 
The city council is composed of the mayor and eight city councillors. The municipal elections are at each 4 years, each councillor stands for his/her district.

Climate
Salaberry-de-Valleyfield has a humid continental climate (Dfb) with warm summers and long, cold, and snowy winters.

Demographics 

Attractions
The Musée de Société des Deux-Rives (MUSO), which covers the economic and cultural history of the region, is located in the city.

The city houses one of the 10 minor basilicas in Quebec. Cathedral-Basilica of Saint Cecilia, built in 1934–1935, is one of the largest churches in the country.

The city has been the site of the Valleyfield Regattas since 1938. The event takes place every year at the beginning of July over a three-day period in the heart of the city on Bay Saint-François. It is an international hydroplane competition, in which power boats achieve speeds of up to 225 km/h.  Attracting over 130,000 visitors per year, it also includes other cultural activities.

Education
   9 daycare facilities
   3 pre-kindergarten centres
 12 elementary schools (some with daycare services), of which one is English-language.
   1 high school
   1 adult education centre
 1 vocational training centre
   1 CEGEP: Collège de Valleyfield
1 French-language university centre

Gault Institute
The Gault Institute was created by Andrew Frederick Gault. He created this school during the time that the Gault Cotton Mills were up and running. To heat the school at one time he used underground pipes connecting from the school to the Cotton Mills since at the time there was no electricity.

Notable people
 Lise Bacon: Quebec politician.
 Line Beauchamp: Quebec politician.
 Jean-Luc Brassard: Olympic gold medalist in skiing.
 Pierre Cossette: television and Broadway producer.
 Mélodie Daoust: Olympics gold medalist in ice hockey.
 Paul-Émile Léger: Cardinal of the Catholic Church.
 Suzanne Fortier: Principal at McGill University.
 Armand Frappier: physician and microbiologist.
Karla Homolka: serial killer. 
 Vladimir Katriuk (1921-2015): alleged Nazi war criminal.
 Dominic Larocque: Para ice hockey athlete.
 J. Albert Leduc: ice hockey player and businessman.
 Serge Marcil: politician and Minister of Employment in 1994.
 Anne Minh-Thu Quach: MP for Beauharnois—Salaberry.
 Jean Ouimet: former leader of the Green Party of Quebec.

See also
 Beauharnois-Salaberry Regional County Municipality
 Beauharnois Canal
 List of cities in Quebec

References

External links

Salaberry-de-Valleyfield official website

 
Cities and towns in Quebec
Quebec populated places on the Saint Lawrence River
Port settlements in Quebec
Incorporated places in Beauharnois-Salaberry Regional County Municipality
Incorporated places in Montérégie